Desulfovibrio gracilis is a moderately halophilic bacteria. It is sulfate-reducing, mesophilic and motile. Its type strain is SRL6146T (=DSM 16080T =ATCC BAA-904T).

References

Further reading
Staley, James T., et al. "Bergey's manual of systematic bacteriology, vol. 3. "Williams and Wilkins, Baltimore, MD (2012).

External links 
LPSN

Type strain of Desulfovibrio gracilis at BacDive -  the Bacterial Diversity Metadatabase

Bacteria described in 2004
Desulfovibrio